Dean Halverson is a former professional American football player who played linebacker for seven seasons in the National Football League (NFL) for the Los Angeles Rams, Atlanta Falcons, and Philadelphia Eagles.

Born and raised in Olympia, Washington, Halverson played college football at the University of Washington in Seattle under head coach Jim Owens. He was selected in the thirteenth round of the 1968 NFL/AFL Draft by the Rams, 351st overall.

References

External links
 

1946 births
American football linebackers
Los Angeles Rams players
Atlanta Falcons players
Philadelphia Eagles players
Washington Huskies football players
Living people
Sportspeople from Olympia, Washington
Players of American football from Washington (state)